Stephen Dunne (born 1988/89) is a Unionist politician from Northern Ireland representing the Democratic Unionist Party (DUP). 

Dunne was co-opted to the Northern Ireland Assembly in 2021 representing North Down to replace his father Gordon Dunne, who had resigned due to ill health shortly before his death.

Dunne started serving on the Ards and North Down Borough Council in 2013; he was re-elected in 2014 and 2019.

References

External links

Living people
Democratic Unionist Party MLAs
Northern Ireland MLAs 2017–2022
Place of birth missing (living people)
Year of birth missing (living people)
Northern Ireland MLAs 2022–2027